Nery McKeen (born April 26, 1957) is a retired Cuban middle distance runner who specialized in the 800 metres. She won the gold medal at the 1983 Pan American Games.

Her personal best time was 2.00.23 minutes, achieved in June 1985 in Prague.

International competitions

References

1957 births
Living people
Cuban female middle-distance runners
Pan American Games gold medalists for Cuba
Pan American Games medalists in athletics (track and field)
Athletes (track and field) at the 1979 Pan American Games
Athletes (track and field) at the 1983 Pan American Games
Central American and Caribbean Games gold medalists for Cuba
Central American and Caribbean Games bronze medalists for Cuba
Competitors at the 1978 Central American and Caribbean Games
Competitors at the 1982 Central American and Caribbean Games
Competitors at the 1986 Central American and Caribbean Games
Central American and Caribbean Games medalists in athletics
Medalists at the 1979 Pan American Games
Medalists at the 1983 Pan American Games